The  was a commuter electric multiple unit (EMU) train type formerly operated by the private railway operator Keisei Electric Railway in the Tokyo area of Japan from 1968 until February 2015.

Operations
In their later years, the 3300 series sets normally operated on all-stations "Local" services on the Keisei Main Line.

Formations
By 1 April 2014, the fleet consisted of just two four-car sets, formed as follows.

All cars were motored, and the two M1' cars were each fitted with one lozenge-type pantograph.

History

The  3300 series trains entered service in November 1968. A total of 54 vehicles were built between 1968 and 1972. Initially without air-conditioning, roof-mounted air-conditioning units were installed to the fleet from 1984. The fleet was refurbished between 1989 and 1992, with the front headlamps moved to below the cab windows.

Withdrawals began in 2003 due to accident damage. The last remaining sets were withdrawn from service on 28 February 2015, following special commemorative limited express services run from Keisei Ueno to Narita.

Liveries
The trains were initially painted in a two-tone livery of ivory and "fire orange" separated by a silver waistline stripe. From 1981, the livery was changed to all-over "fire orange" with an ivory waistline stripe, and from 1993, the trains were repainted into a new livery of "active silver" with "human red" and "future blue" bodyside stripes.

Lease to Hokuso Railway

Two four-car sets were leased to the third-sector Hokuso Railway in 2006, operating as an eight-car 7260 series unit, numbered 7261, until March 2015.

References

External links

 Keisei rolling stock information 

Keisei Electric Railway
Tokyu Car multiple units
Electric multiple units of Japan
Train-related introductions in 1968
1500 V DC multiple units of Japan
Kisha Seizo multiple units
Nippon Sharyo multiple units